County Route 524 (CR 524) is a county highway in the U.S. state of New Jersey. The highway extends  from the White Horse Circle (U.S. Route 206 or US 206 and Route 533) in Hamilton Township to Route 71 in Spring Lake Heights.

There are a few concrete bridge heads which showed that the section of CR 524 between the White Horse Circle and Allentown was in the 1930s part of State Highway Route 37.

Route description 

CR 524 begins at the modified White Horse Circle in the community of White Horse in Hamilton Township, Mercer County, where the route intersects US 206 and the southern terminus of CR 533. From the circle, the route heads east on two-lane undivided South Broad Street, which continues toward Trenton as part of US 206 west of the White Horse Circle. CR 524 passes homes before reaching an interchange with Interstate 195 (I-195), where the route is a four-lane divided highway maintained by the New Jersey Department of Transportation with a wide median. After this, the road becomes undivided and county-maintained again, passing more suburban homes and becoming a divided highway briefly again at an intersection with Boulevard/Kim Valley Road in business areas. CR 524 narrows back into a two-lane undivided road turns southeast and crosses Conrail Shared Assets Operations' Robbinsville Industrial Track line near industrial establishments. The road passes more businesses as it reaches an intersection with CR 609 and CR 672 in the community of Yardville. At this point, CR 672 continues along South Broad Street while CR 524 heads east onto Yardville-Allentown Road, intersecting Route 156 and interchanging with US 130. From this point, the road continues through a mix of residences and woodland before passing over the New Jersey Turnpike (I-95). Past this bridge, the route heads into agricultural areas with some woods and homes.

CR 524 continues into Upper Freehold Township in Monmouth County and runs through wooded areas of residences before crossing into Allentown. The route intersects CR 28 and turns northeast onto Main Street, passing more homes. After running near Connies Millpond, CR 524 forms a concurrency with CR 539, with the two routes continuing along Main Street to a short overlap with CR 526. The road leaves Allentown for Upper Freehold Township and enters farmland as it intersects CR 526 Spur. A short distance later, CR 524/CR 539 reaches an interchange with I-195. At this point, the name of the road becomes Stage Coach Road and it forms the border between Robbinsville Township, Mercer County to the west and Upper Freehold Township, Monmouth County to the east briefly before CR 524 splits from CR 539 by turning east and fully entering Upper Freehold Township, retaining the Stage Coach Road name. CR 524 continues through open agricultural areas with a few homes, intersecting CR 43. The road heads into a mix of farms, woods, and residences as it enters Millstone Township and comes to a junction with CR 571. At this point, CR 571 joins CR 524 and the two routes make a sharp turn to the southeast into wooded residential areas, turning east at an intersection with Red Valley Road/Spring Road. CR 571 splits from CR 524 by turning south on Millstone Road, with CR 524 heading northeast and entering areas of farmland. The route heads into wooded areas of homes before reaching an intersection with CR 537, at which point CR 524 joins CR 537. The two routes head northeast along Monmouth Road, forming the border between Millstone Township to the northwest and Freehold Township to the southeast. Upon crossing CR 527, the road forms the border between Manalapan Township and Freehold Township as passes near farms and homes.

CR 524 splits from CR 537 by turning east onto Elton Road, fully entering Freehold Township. On this road, the route passes through agricultural areas before heading through suburban residential subdivisions, becoming Elton-Adelphia Road as it comes to intersections with CR 23 and US 9. From here, CR 524 heads southeast onto Adelphia Road and heads into Howell Township and passes more housing developments. The road continues into residential areas with a few farms before CR 524A splits off, running farther south of CR 524. The route heads east through more wooded areas of residences before crossing the inactive Freehold Industrial Track railroad line operated by the Delaware and Raritan River Railroad and entering Farmingdale. The road passes homes and businesses before coming to the CR 35 junction, where CR 524 turns southeast onto Main Street. In the center of Farmingdale, CR 547 joins CR 524 from the north and the two routes pass businesses before crossing the Southern Secondary railroad line operated by the Delaware and Raritan River Railroad. The road makes a turn to the south and crosses back into Howell Township, intersecting CR 18.  The two routes continues south through wooded areas of homes and businesses on Lakewood-Farmingdale Road before the CR 524A intersects from the west.

At this point, CR 524 splits from CR 547 by turning east onto Allaire Road and entering densely forested areas of Allaire State Park, passing under I-195 before entering Wall Township. The road turns southeast as it passes Allaire Village and intersects CR 30. As CR 524 approaches the Garden State Parkway, the route splits from Allaire Road by heading southeast on Atlantic Avenue and crossing over the parkway, with Allaire Road becoming a dead end road on either side of the Garden State Parkway. After the bridge, CR 524 turns northeast onto Allenwood Road, with CR 524 Spur continuing along Atlantic Avenue. The route turns east again and resumes along Allaire Road, passing homes before intersecting Route 34 at the Allenwood Circle. The road continues through a mix of fields, woods, and residences before passing Osborne Pond. CR 524 reaches intersections with CR 47 and Route 35 in business areas before crossing into Spring Lake Heights. The route passes several homes before coming to its eastern terminus at Route 71, where the road continues east as Ludlow Avenue toward the Atlantic Ocean.

History 
From Our House Tavern, a short distance west of Farmingdale, to Squankum, was maintained as part of the Farmingdale and Squankum Turnpike, chartered in 1866. Its charter allowed it to extend its turnpike to Manasquan.

Between 1927 and 1953, the road between Trenton and Allentown was once signed as part of Route 37. Concrete bridge heads confirm this, and USGS topographical maps indicate that the road was signed as such until at least 1948.

Major intersections

Bannered and suffixed routes

County Route 524A

County Route 524A (also County Route 524 Alternate or CR 524A) is a county highway in Howell Township. The highway extends 3.74 miles (6.02 km) as Squankum-Yellowbrook Road in Howell Township. The highway acts as a by-pass of the borough of Farmingdale. For CR 524A's entire run, the speed limit is 45 mph (72 km/h). Though the state's straight line diagram of the route states that the road is east-west, CR 524A is signed by Monmouth County as a north-south route.

CR 524A begins at a signalized intersection with its parent route, CR 524 west of Farmingdale. It turns to the south-east, the direction it follows for most of its existence. At mile marker 1.63, CR 524A intersects CR 21 (Southard Avenue), near Howell High School. It passes Howell Golf Course, crosses the abandoned Freehold-Jamesburg railroad line, and comes to an end at its parent route, CR 524 and CR 547 just north of Interstate 195's exit 31.

Major intersections

County Route 524 Spur 

County Route 524 Spur is a spur route of CR 524 from Wall Township to Manasquan. The highway extends  from Allenwood Road (CR 524) in Wall Township to Broad Street (Monmouth CR 20) in Manasquan and is known as Atlantic Avenue for its entire length.

CR 524 Spur begins at an intersection with CR 524 just east of its overpass over the Garden State Parkway in southern Wall Township. It heads southeast for about a  before reaching a skewed intersection with Allenwood-Lakewood Road (CR 21) and Ramshorn Drive. CR 524 Spur turns east and has a partial cloverleaf interchange with Route 34. After a slight curve at Tiltons Corner Road, CR 524 Spur continues east past numerous businesses and an apartment complex. A traffic circle is at its intersection with Route 35. Past the traffic circle, the route enters Manasquan and ends at a T-intersection with Broad Street, next to the Manasquan High School.

CR 524 Spur formerly continued north on Broad Street and Sea Girt Avenue (CR 49) to end at Route 71 on the border of Manasquan and Sea Girt.

Major intersections

See also

References

External links

NJ State Highways: CR 515-530
CR 524 pictures
Histories of CR 524 in Monmouth County, CR 524A, and CR 524 Spur

500-series county routes in New Jersey
Roads in Mercer County, New Jersey
Roads in Monmouth County, New Jersey